Rochdale railway station is a multi-modal transport hub in Rochdale, Greater Manchester, England. It consists of a Northern-operated heavy rail station on the Caldervale Line, and an adjoining light rail stop on Metrolink's Oldham and Rochdale Line. The original heavy-rail element of the station was opened by the Manchester and Leeds Railway in 1839 (for economical reasons)  to the south of Rochdale town centre. The Metrolink element opened in February 2013. Further changes to the station are planned as part of the Northern Hub rail-enhancement scheme.

History

Heavy rail

The town's first station, which opened in 1839, was adjacent to Moss Lane and located around 300 yards (270 m) east of the present one. The single storey structure was replaced by the current depot in April 1889, being too small to handle the increasing traffic levels on the Lancashire and Yorkshire Railway's main line between Leeds & Manchester and the associated branch lines to Bury (1848), Oldham (1863) and Bacup (1881) that had subsequently been opened.

It had eight platforms (four through platforms and four bays) and two entrances, one on Maclure Road and another on Miall Street. In 1979 the station was reduced to three platforms (with the closure and abandonment of the eastern island platform and its bays), and the Miall Street entrance was closed. Passengers thereafter had to walk through a subway from the Maclure Road entrance and climb stairs to the main concourse, which includes a ticket office and snack bar.

Currently, only the two through platforms are regularly used: the former Oldham bay platform is still available but is normally only for stabling empty stock or turning back late-running trains from the Todmorden direction. Terminating trains from Manchester and beyond use the stub of the former Oldham branch (which has been converted into a turnback siding) to reverse clear of the main line. Signalling at the station has also been modernised, with colour lights controlled from Castleton replacing the semaphores previously in use (the old signal box at Rochdale had to be demolished in 2011 as it stood in the alignment of the planned Metrolink flyover).

In 2015, construction on a fourth railway platform began. The 135m-long bay platform was completed in 2016 and is used to relieve congestion at Manchester Victoria, where terminating trains would otherwise occupy the through platforms; numerous services now continue on to Rochdale as opposed to terminating at Victoria.  It is located at the south end of the main island platform, with the southbound through line having been re-aligned slightly further east to accommodate the new terminating line and is used by the half-hourly stopping service from Blackburn/Clitheroe via Bolton and Victoria.

Metrolink

Proposals to link Rochdale to a light rail system were put forward in the 1980s, but remained unfunded until the 2000s. Plans to extend Greater Manchester's Metrolink light rail network to Rochdale were part expansion project Phase 3A, began in 2009. Under these plans, most of the Oldham Loop line was converted to light rail operation. Northern Rail services via Oldham ceased in October 2009, when the line closed to allow this conversion work to start. The Metrolink stop at Rochdale Railway Station opened to passengers on 28 February 2013. Trams now pass over the main Caldervale line on a flyover before descending to street level, en route to the new stop at the front of the main line station.

A further phase of the project (Phase 3B) proposed the addition of a Metrolink branch via the old branch line via Oldham Central and the extension of the northern end of the line via a line to Rochdale Town Centre. Following the rejection of the Greater Manchester Transport Innovation Fund in a referendum in 2008, Phase 3B of the project was in doubt until new funding from national and local government enabled the project to go ahead. These extensions were completed through to Oldham in January 2014 and the extension to the centre of Rochdale was completed in late March 2014.

Services

National Rail Services

The services on this route have been revamped significantly at the December 2008 timetable change and again in May 2018.

Four of the six Manchester trains run non-stop; the other two serve all intermediate stations.

Eastbound there are two trains via Bradford Interchange (one calling only at Todmorden, Hebden Bridge and Halifax, the other calling at all stations east of Todmorden) to Leeds and one via Brighouse and Dewsbury plus the Blackburn service.

In the evenings there is a half-hourly service eastbound, with alternate trains extended to Leeds via Bradford or to Blackburn. Westbound there are two non-stop and two stopping trains to Manchester, with the latter continuing through towards Bolton.  On Sundays there are two trains per hour each way - one Southport and Manchester to Todmorden and Blackburn service (serving all stations except Walsden) and an hourly Calder Valley service that runs non-stop to/from Manchester and then calls at stations to Hebden Bridge, but then Halifax only en-route to Bradford.

Metrolink Services

There is a basic service of five trams per hour (every 12 minutes) to Oldham and Manchester Victoria tram stop, continuing on to East Didsbury tram stop, each weekday from 06.00 until 00.30 Monday–Thursday and until 01.20 Fridays and Saturdays. On Sundays between 09.00 and 18.00, a 12-minute frequency operates and a 15-minute service outside these times.

Park and Ride
The station is served by a 217 space Park and Ride car park. This is located on Hare Street to the rear of the railway station. This car park is available for users of both Metrolink and rail services.

Northern Hub

Following Metrolink enhancements, £300,000 has been jointly invested by Network Rail, Northern and the GMITA to renovate the station, as part of the Department for Transport's National Station Improvement Programme. The CCTV system will be extended, and there will be upgraded toilets, improved flooring and work on the subway.

A further round of upgrades and improvements to the station was announced by government in July 2012 as part of the Northern Hub rail upgrade scheme for the Manchester area. These will include the provision of a new turnback facility (bay platform) for terminating trains from the Manchester direction at the south end of the station (due for completion in May 2016) and the refurbishment and recommissioning of the disused Miall St subway; this was duly reopened in July 2015. Completion of the works in the Manchester area could then permit through running from the station to  via the new Ordsall chord as well as to Liverpool and Blackpool via Manchester Victoria.

Several of these proposals have since been included in the new Northern franchise, which became active in April 2016. The operator's new Northern Connect network will serve the station and offer through services to Liverpool and  via ; there will be also extra evening and Sunday trains on the existing routes.

Notes

Gallery

References
The Manchester and Leeds Railway by Martin Bairstow
Lost Railways of Lancashire by Gordon Suggitt

External links

Metrolink stop information
Rochdale railway station area map
David Hey's Steam Collection - "Rail Cameraman Barry Hilton's 'Railways Around Rochdale'"
Rochdale Railway Station Metrolink station plans

Railway stations in the Metropolitan Borough of Rochdale
DfT Category C2 stations 
Former Lancashire and Yorkshire Railway stations
Railway stations in Great Britain opened in 1839
Railway stations in Great Britain closed in 1889
Railway stations in Great Britain opened in 1889
Northern franchise railway stations
Tram stops in the Metropolitan Borough of Rochdale
Railway stations in Great Britain opened in 2013
Tram stops on the East Didsbury to Rochdale line
Rochdale